Anthony Maddox (born November 22, 1978) is a former American football defensive tackle. He was drafted by the Jacksonville Jaguars in the fourth round of the 2004 NFL Draft. He played college football at Delta State.

Early years
Maddox played high school football at Monroe Comprehensive High School in Albany, Georgia. He was a three-time All-District selection and a three-time All-Conference selection. After his senior football season, he was invited to participate in the 1997 Georgia-Florida All-Star game.

College career
Maddox played college football at Jones County Junior College and Delta State University. He started his career at JCJC by playing linebacker and defensive end. He was a member of the JCJC Bobcats' 12-0 national championship team in 1998. After two years at JCJC, he went two years without playing football and was working in a furniture store in Hattiesburg, Mississippi. After two years of being out of football, he went to Delta State where he recorded 150 tackles and 10.5 sacks. As a senior, he was selected as the Gulf South Conference's Defensive Player of the Year, becoming the first player in school history to win this award. He also achieved All-America selection by American Football Coaches Association, and All-Gulf South Conference first-team.

Professional career

Jacksonville Jaguars
Maddox was drafted by the Jacksonville Jaguars in the fourth round of the 2004 NFL Draft. He played two seasons in Jacksonville before being released by on September 2, 2006.

Houston Texans
Maddox was signed to the Houston Texans practice squad on September 5, 2006, and was signed to the active roster on October 10, 2006, after an injury to Travis Johnson.

On August 29, 2008, the Texans released Maddox.

Post-NFL career

He established the Anthony Maddox Foundation in 2008. The Foundation is designed to benefit the single parents and poverty-stricken youngsters. He is currently an assistant coach for the JCJC football team. He is married with four children.

External links
Houston Texans bio

1978 births
Living people
American football defensive tackles
Jones County Bobcats football players
Delta State Statesmen football players
Jacksonville Jaguars players
Houston Texans players
Edmonton Elks players
People from Moultrie, Georgia
Sportspeople from Albany, Georgia